James Brannon House is a historic home located at Lowell, Lake County, Indiana.  It was built in 1898, and is a two-story, Queen Anne / Free Classic style frame dwelling.  It has clapboard siding and patterned wood shingles on the gable ends.  It features a full width front porch and several stained glass windows.

It was listed in the National Register of Historic Places in 2011.

References

Houses on the National Register of Historic Places in Indiana
Queen Anne architecture in Indiana
Houses completed in 1898
Buildings and structures in Lake County, Indiana
National Register of Historic Places in Lake County, Indiana
1898 establishments in Indiana